The 1960 United States Senate election in Alabama was held on November 8, 1960. 

Incumbent Senator John Sparkman was re-elected to a third term in office over Republican Julian Elgin.

Democratic primary

Candidates
Zeke Calhoun
 John G. Crommelin, retired U.S. Navy Rear Admiral and white supremacist
 John Sparkman, incumbent Senator

Results

General election

Results

See also 
 1960 United States Senate elections

References 

1960
Alabama
United States Senate